I never may refer to:
I Never, a drinking game especially popular with University students
"I Never", a song by Jessica Simpson from her 2001 album Irresistible
"I Never", a song by Rilo Kiley from their 2004 album More Adventurous